Nivruttinath (c. 11 February 1273 – 24 June 1297) was a 13th-century Marathi Bhakti saint, poet, philosopher and yogi of the Vaishnava Nath tradition. He was the elder brother and the mentor (guru) of Dnyaneshwar, the first Varkari saint.

Family and early life
Nivruttinath was born in Apegaon village on the bank of Godavari river near Paithan in Maharashtra into a Deshastha Brahmin family during the reign of the Yadava King Ramadevarava.

Nivruttinath was one of the four children, and the eldest son, of Vitthalapant, a kulkarni (hereditary accountant), and Rakhumabai.

Vitthalapant and his wife gave up their lives, within a year of each other by jumping into the Indrayani River, leaving two sons, Dnyaneshwar and Sopan, and a daughter, Muktabai, to be taken care of by Nivruttinath.

Nath Tradition
At around the age of 10, Nivruttinath's family moved to Nashik. During a pilgrimage trip, Vitthalapant along with his family was confronted by a tiger. The family escaped while Nivruttinath got separated from the family. He hid in a cave on the Anjani mountain where he met Gahaninath, who initiated Nivruttinath into the wisdom of the Nath tradition.

Dnyaneshwar as disciple

The Natha Tradition is an initiatory Guru–shishya tradition. After the death of their parents,  Nivruttinath initiated Dnyaneshwar into the Nath tradition and become his teacher (Guru).

Nivruttinath advised Dnyaneshwar to write an independent philosophical work. This work later came to be known as Amrutanubhav.

Death and Resting Place
After the Samadhi of Dnyaneshwar, Nivruttinath left Alandi with his sister, Muktabai for a pilgrimage. During a thunderstorm, Muktabai was lost. Nivruttinath then attained Samadhi. The Resting place is situated near Trimbakeshwar. At his resting place, a temple has been erected which is visited by numerous devotees.

See also

 Dnyaneshwar
 Sopan
 Muktabai
 Bhakti movement
 Changdev Maharaj

References

Bibliography

 
 
 
 

Marathi-language writers
Warkari
Hindu philosophers and theologians
Marathi Hindu saints